The following is a list of notable events and releases of the year 2019 in Finnish music.

Events

January 
 11 – The 23rd Folklandia Cruise start in Helsinki (January 11 – 12).

February 
 10 – The Kokkola Winter Accordion Festival start (February 10 – 17).

March 
 6 – The 50th Turku Jazz Festival start in Åbo (March 6 – 10).

April 
 11 – The Tampere Biennale start (April 11 – 15).
 14 – The Hetta Music Event start in Enontekiö (April 14–21).
 24 – The 32nd April Jazz Espoo starts (April 25 – 29).

May 
 16 – The Vaasa Choir Festival starts (May 16 – 19).

June

July 
 5 – The Baltic Jazz festival starts in Dalsbruk (July 5 – 7).
 8 – The 52nd Kaustinen Folk Music Festival starts (July 8 – 14).
 12 – The 54th Pori Jazz Festival starts in Pori, Finland (July 12 – 20).

August 
 7 – The Rauma Festivo Music Festival start (August 7–11).

September 
 5 – The 20th Lahti Sibelius Festival start (September 5–8).

Deaths

January

February 
 12 – Olli Lindholm, rock singer and guitarist, Yö and Appendix (born 1964).

See also 
 2019 in Finland
 Music of Finland
 Finland in the Eurovision Song Contest 2019

References

 
Finnish music
Finnish